Kaviz, also rendered as Kauz or Kuiz, may refer to:
 Kaviz-e Olya, Kerman Province
 Kaviz-e Sofla, Kerman Province
 Kaviz-e Diklan, Razavi Khorasan Province